Brusturi is a commune in Neamț County, Western Moldavia, Romania. It is composed of four villages: Brusturi, Groși, Poiana and Târzia. Called Brusturi-Drăgănești until 2004, it included four other villages until that year, when these were split off to form Drăgănești Commune.

References

Communes in Neamț County
Localities in Western Moldavia